Anaheim Town Square (originally  East Anaheim Shopping Center, later East Anaheim Center, East Anaheim Plaza), is a  community shopping center, the largest center in East Anaheim, California which was built at the intersection of Anaheim-Olive Road (now Lincoln Avenue) and Placentia Avenue (now State College Boulevard).

In 1968 the center sales volume was $20,000,000.

The Boston Store branch was rebuilt in 1984.

In mid-2017, the Kmart closed and was replaced by a  small-format Target store.

The center today has  of gross leasable area, with anchors Target, Hispanic-focused supermarket Northgate Market (the population was 69% Hispanic within a 1-mile radius in 2018), Ross Dress for Less, Goodwill, Pep Boys, a United States Post Office, and discount stores 99 Cents Only Stores and Five Below.

References

Anaheim, California
Shopping malls in Orange County, California
Community shopping centers